Darda Sales  (born September 1, 1982)  is a Canadian swimmer, 4.0 point wheelchair basketball player and motivational speaker. She won gold medals with the 4x100 medley relay team at the 2000 Summer Paralympics in Sydney and the 2002 IPC Swimming World Championships in Mar del Plata, and a silver medal at the 2004 Summer Paralympics in Athens. She switched to wheelchair basketball after she retired from swimming in 2009, and won a gold medal in that sport at the 2014 Women's World Wheelchair Basketball Championship in Toronto.

Biography
Darda Geiger was born in London, Ontario, on September 1, 1982. She was the youngest of four children, with two older brothers and an older sister. She grew up on a farm in rural Ontario. In 1985, when she was two, she lost her right leg above the knee in a farm accident. She has a Bachelor of Arts with Honors degree in kinesiology from the University of Western Ontario and a postgraduate certificate in therapeutic recreation. She is an athlete therapeutic recreational therapist.

When Geiger was nine, she met three athletes who were training for the 1992 Summer Paralympics in Barcelona, and decided to become a Paralympian too. This dream came true at the 2000 Summer Paralympics in Sydney. As a member of the 4x100 medley relay team, she won a gold medal in the world record time. This was followed by a gold medal in the same event at the IPC Swimming World Championships in 2002, and a silver at the 2004 Summer Paralympics in Athens. She also won bronze medals in the 100 m freestyle and 400 m freestyle events at the 2006 IPC World Championships.

Geiger married Brad Sales, a fellow Paralympic swimmer and member of the Canadian national swim team, and now goes by the name of Darda Sales. They have three children. She competed in the 50 m, 100 m and 400m freestyle and the 100 m backstroke events at the 2008 Summer Paralympics in Beijing, her third Paralympic Games, but did not win a medal.

Sales retired from swimming in 2009, but became interested in wheelchair basketball. She competed for Team Ontario at the women's national championships, and made the national team in 2014. She was part of the team that won a gold medal at the 2014 Women's World Wheelchair Basketball Championship in Toronto in July 2014. and silver at the 2015 Parapan American Games in August 2015.

References

External links
 
 
 

1982 births
Living people
Paralympic gold medalists for Canada
Paralympic silver medalists for Canada
Canadian women's wheelchair basketball players
Paralympic swimmers of Canada
Swimmers from London, Ontario
Medalists at the 2000 Summer Paralympics
Medalists at the 2004 Summer Paralympics
Swimmers at the 2000 Summer Paralympics
Swimmers at the 2004 Summer Paralympics
Wheelchair basketball players at the 2016 Summer Paralympics
Paralympic medalists in wheelchair basketball
Paralympic medalists in swimming
Paralympic wheelchair basketball players of Canada
Canadian female freestyle swimmers
S9-classified Paralympic swimmers